Farhana Sultana is a Full Professor of Geography at Syracuse University, where she is also a Research Director for the Program on Environmental Collaboration and Conflicts at the Maxwell School of Citizenship and Public Affairs. Her research considers how water management and climate change impact society. Her first book, The Right to Water: Politics, Governance and Social Struggles, investigates the relationships between human rights and access to clean water.

Early life and education 
Sultana earned her bachelor's degree in earth sciences at Princeton University. She graduated cum laude in 1996 before moving to the University of Minnesota for her graduate studies. After earning her master's degree Sultana joined the United Nations Development Programme (UNDP) where she worked as a programme officer for their environmental work in Bangladesh. She worked with a variety of both governmental and non-governmental organizations. After three years at the UNDP Sultana returned to the University of Minnesota where she worked toward doctorate in the Department of Geography as a MacArthur Fellow. Her graduate research considered flooding, shrimp farming and arsenic contamination, with her dissertation on drinking water crises and its impacts in Bangladesh.

Research and career 
In 2005 Sultana joined the University of Manchester as Fellow in the School of Environment and Development. She moved to King's College London in 2006, where she was made a faculty member in the Department of Geography. In 2008 Sultana moved back to the United States, and joined the Department of Geography at Syracuse University as a Professor. She is a Visiting Fellow of the International Centre for Climate Change and Development. Sultana is interested in water governance and social change, the politics associated with adapting to climate change and how to decolonise systems and institutions.

She is well known for her scholarship and activism on climate justice, water justice, and equitable development. She has studied how gender, class and policy impact water management in Bangladesh. Flooding is an integral part of the Bangladeshi landscape and strengthens the farmlands, but large scale population growth brings a burden to the land. She has analysed how urban water governance impacts the poor and how the right to water is understood. She has studied the political disputes over the Ganges, and how changing river dynamics impact lives and the economy.

Awards and honours 
 2019 American Association of Geographers Glenda Laws Award
Co-signatory with Pope Francis in “Rome Declaration on the Human Right to Water”

Selected publications 
Of several dozen publications, some include:

Journal papers

Books

References 

Living people
Year of birth missing (living people)
Bangladeshi women academics
Bangladeshi women scientists
University of Minnesota alumni
Environmental scientists
Women limnologists